The 48th International Emmys Awards took place on November 23, 2020, in New York City. The award ceremony, presented by the International Academy of Television Arts and Sciences (IATAS), honors all TV programming produced and originally aired outside the United States and celebrated excellence in International television.

The International Academy presented 1 Special Award and 12 Emmys across 11 categories, due to a tie in the Non-English Language U.S. Primetime category. Due to the COVID-19 pandemic, the awards were held virtually for the first time in the history of International Emmys.

Ceremony
Nominations for the 48th International Emmy Awards were announced on September 24, 2020, by the International Academy of Television Arts & Sciences (IATAS). There are 44 Nominees across 11 categories and 20 countries. Nominees come from: Argentina, Australia, Belgium, Brazil, China, Colombia, Czech Republic, France, Germany, India, Israel, Italy, Japan, Norway, Portugal, Singapore, South Korea, Thailand, the United Kingdom and the United States. All these programs were broadcast between January 1 and December 31, 2019; in accordance with the competition's eligibility period. Netflix led as nominations for the award, followed by HBO and Rede Globo.

In addition to the presentation of the International Emmys for programming and performances, the International Academy presented one special award. New York Governor Andrew Cuomo received the Founders Award in recognition of his leadership during the COVID-19 pandemic in New York. In August 2021, International TV Academy rescinds Cuomo's Emmy. Cuomo stepped down as governor after a state investigation concluded he sexually harassed women who worked for him.

Winners and nominees

Countries with multiple nominations and awards

References

External links 
 International Academy of Television Arts and Sciences website

International Emmy Awards ceremonies
International Emmy Awards
2020 in New York City
2020 awards in the United States
2020 television awards
November 2020 events in the United States